Darshan Pandya is an Indian actor, known for his portrayals as Aditya Verma in Aapki Antara, Vineet Raizaada in Kya Huaa Tera Vaada and Dr. Aman Malhotra in Itna Karo Na Mujhe Pyaar.
He acted as a spy in the movie, Parmanu: The Story of Pokhran.
Recently he did a web series "RAAZI" for voot.

Acting career

Darshan has worked on several theatrical shows with renowned theatre personality, Manoj Shah, through his theatre company, Ideas Unlimited. He has also done several voice-overs and Gujarati TV shows. Darshan's first appearance on Indian television as a main lead was with Aapki Antara on Zee TV in 2009 where he played Aditya Verma. Later in 2011, he played the antagonist Devashish Mukherji aka Ashmit Kapoor in Yahaaan Main Ghar Ghar Kheli. He then went on to play Vineet Raizada in the 2012 show, Kya Huaa Tera Vaada on Sony Entertainment Television. Then He went on and played very humorous character Dr. Aman Malhotra in Balaji Telefilms show, Itna Karo Na Mujhe Pyaar along with Ronit Roy and Pallavi Kulkarni among others on Sony Entertainment. He did a film in 2018 Parmanu for JA entertainment, he played a character of Pakistani agent Sajjan. Recently he did a web series "RAAZI" for Voot.

Television

Filmography

References 

Indian male television actors
Indian male film actors
Living people
Male actors in Hindi cinema
Indian male models
Gujarati people
Male actors from Mumbai
Male actors in Hindi television
Year of birth missing (living people)